This is a list of online databases accessible via the Internet.

A

 Abandoned & Little-Known Airfields
 Academic OneFile
 Acronym Finder
 Aeiou Encyclopedia
 Airiti Inc
 Airliners.net
 All Media Guide
 Allgame (down)
 Allmovie
 Allmusic
 American National Corpus
 Animal Diversity Web
 Animal Genome Size Database
 Animator.ru
 Arachne
 ArchINFORM
 Archive site
 ArtCyclopedia
Amazon.com
Aviation Safety Reporting System

B

 Bank of English
 Beilstein database
 BiblioPage.com
 Bibliotek.dk
 Big Cartoon DataBase
 Big Comic Book DataBase
 Bioinformatic Harvester
 BoardGameGeek

C

 CAMPUS
 Catholic-Hierarchy.org
 CellarTracker
 ChEBI
 Chemical Abstracts Service
 Chessgames.com
 China Pollution Map Database
 CIDOB Foundation
 Cinema and Science
 CiteSeer
 ClassRanked.com
 Collection of Computer Science Bibliographies
 Comic book price guide
 Comics Buyer's Guide
 Credo Reference
 Croatian National Corpus
 Current Biography

D

 DBLP
 DIALOG
 Dictionary of Canadian Biography
 Discogs

E

 Earth Human STR Allele Frequencies Database
 ELDIS
 EMBASE
 Encyclopedia Astronautica
 Encyclopedia Mythica
 English Short Title Catalogue
 Entrez
 Everyone's a Critic

F

 Factiva
 Facts on File
 Fashion Model Directory
 Filmarchives online
 Filmweb
 Find a Grave
 FINDbase (the Frequency of INherited Disorders database)
 FishBase
 Flags of the World
 Flora Europaea

G

 Gallica
 GameRankings
 GeneNetwork
 GeoNames
 Gesamtkatalog der Wiegendrucke
 Getty Thesaurus of Geographic Names
 Golm Metabolome Database
 Google
 Grand Comics Database

H

 Hong Kong Movie DataBase
 Hoover's
 HotPads.com

I

 IGDB (Internet Games Database)
 IMDb (Internet Movie Database)
 INDUCKS
 IndexMaster
 Informit (database)
 Inorganic Crystal Structure Database
 Interment.net
 Internet Archive
 The Internet Book Database
 The Internet Book Database of Fiction
 Internet Broadway Database
 Internet Movie Cars Database
 Internet Movie Firearms Database
 Internet Off-Broadway Database
 Internet Public Library
 Internet Speculative Fiction Database
 Internet Theatre Database
 ISBNdb.com

J

 Jewish Virtual Library
 Jointly Administered Knowledge Environment
 JSTOR

K

 Kdo byl kdo
 Killer List of Videogames

L

 Lattes
 Lesson Planet
 LexisNexis
 The Literary Encyclopedia

M

 Media Bias/Fact Check
 MedlinePlus
 Metacritic
 Metropolitan Travel Survey Archive
 MICAD
 Mindat.org
 MobyGames
 Movie Review Query Engine
 Moviemistakes.com
 MovieTome
 MSDSonline
 MusicBrainz
 MyAnimeList
 MySql

N

 Names Database
 NEO CANDO
 Newsknowledge
 Nichigai WHO
 NNDB

O

 Omniglot
 On-Line Encyclopedia of Integer Sequences
 Open Source Vulnerability Database

P

 Paradisec
 PHI-base
 Philosophy Research Index
 Plant DNA C-values Database
 Plants for a Future
 Price guide
 ProBiS
 ProQuest
 Proteomics Identifications Database
 Psephos
 PsycINFO
 PubChem
 PubMed Central

Q

 Questia – defunct

R

 Rate Your Music
 REBASE Restriction Enzyme Database
 RedLightGreen
 Reptile Database
 Roller Coaster DataBase
 Roud Folk Song Index

S

 Scots Law Times
 SeatGuru
 Sharecare
 Sherdog
 The Simpsons Archive
 The Skyscraper Center
 SmealSearch
 Svenskt Diplomatarium

T

 TCM Movie Database
 Textfiles.com
 TheTVDB
 Tocsearch
 TOSEC
 Transterm
 Truthfinder
 TV.com

U

 Uchronia: The Alternate History List
 Ultimate Guitar Archive

V

 Vastari
 VET-Bib
 Virtuoso Universal Server

W

 Web of Science
 Who's Who (UK)
 WinCustomize
 Wind ENergy Data & Information (WENDI) Gateway
 Wikidata
 World Biographical Information System Online
 World Wide Molecular Matrix
 WorldCat

Z

 Zaask
 Zabasearch.com
 Zillow
 ZINC database

See also 
 List of academic databases and search engines
 List of biodiversity databases
 List of chemical databases
 List of neuroscience databases
 List of ontologies

References

 
Databases

Databases